The Eliminator is a video game written by Terry Gilman and Wayne Westmoreland for the TRS-80 and published by Adventure International in 1981. It was ported to the Atari 8-bit family and Apple II. The Eliminator is a clone of the Defender arcade game.

Gameplay
The Eliminator is a game in which ten energizers rest atop gantry towers scattered across the planetscape, and the player's mission is to prevent alien creatures from capturing the energizers.

Reception
Bruce Campbell reviewed The Eliminator in The Space Gamer No. 59. Campbell commented that "This is simply my favorite TRS-80 arcade game.  Normally, I would be hesitant to recommend an arcade game costing [this much], but in this case most buyers will consider their money well spent.  An Apple II version is also available, but it appears to be significantly different."

References

External links
Review in 80 Micro
Review in Byte
1984 Software Encyclopedia from Electronic Games
Review in SoftSide

Adventure International games
Apple II games
Atari 8-bit family games
TRS-80 games
Horizontally scrolling shooters
Video game clones
Video games developed in the United States